is a Japanese actor and director, who appeared in  The Human Centipede (First Sequence) and Cobra Kai as Young Sato.

Early life
After moving to the United States at the age of 18, Kitamura studied acting at the Beverly Hills Playhouse for five years. As a filmmaker he studied at the North Carolina School of the Arts (1997–1999) and at Los Angeles City College (2001–2004).

Career
Kitamura's first two feature films, Porno and I'll Be There With You were both written and directed by him. He also starred in both of the films, playing the main characters.

In 2008, Kitamura appeared in a number of television roles, including VH1's New York Goes to Hollywood and MTV's From Gs to Gents. He also appeared in NBC's Heroes as Tadashi, a Japanese businessman who tries to commit suicide. The role's dialogue was done in Japanese to keep with the character.

In 2009, Kitamura made an appearance in the controversial IFC Films horror film The Human Centipede (First Sequence).

Filmography

Television

References

External links

Official blog 
Akihiro on Twitter

1979 births
Living people
Japanese male film actors
University of North Carolina School of the Arts alumni
People from Kōchi, Kōchi
Los Angeles City College alumni
Japanese male television actors
21st-century Japanese male actors